The Narayangarh Raj (also known as Narayangarh Kingdom) was a medieval semi - independent kingdom and later a large zamindari estate of Sadgop during British Raj in the erstwhile Midnapore district of West Bengal. The area of 126.96 square miles was under the Raja of Narayangarh, which included 387 villages.

Mr. Bayley states that the family of the Raja of Narayangarh counts back for twenty - four generations, and bears the titles of 'Sri Chandan' and 'Marh -e- Sultan'.

History
During the reign of the Nripatis of the  Sadgop   Pala Dynasty , there is a tradition of the establishment of small kingdoms of their various branches in many places in Bengal. Gaudeshwar Rajya  Mahipala  ascended the throne in 981 AD. His 3rd Son  Dwarpal established a Kingdom in Northern Rarh. By the latter Rulers it was also extended Southwards. His First capital was at Mallarpur in Birbhum. By the latter rulers it was Shifted to Polba. He also established  Dwarbasini Shaktipeeth  over there.

Dwarbasini Village of  Polba  became the capital during Janardan Pal. There is also a place named Janardanpur. Dwarbasini was Named at the name of Dwarpal.

During 1289 AD Sah Sufi Attacked Dwarbasini, King with his brother Narayan Pal he resisted the Turks several times. But at last they failed,Janardan died in the Battlefield while Narayan Pal took Shelter in further west Medinipur region.

Narayangarh Raj of Midnapore was founded in 1300 by Gondobah Pal, also knowns as Gandharva Pal. It is said that Gandharva Pal was born in  Dwarbasini , which is close to  Polba . Narayangarh Rajas Claim themselves as the ancestor of Narayan Pal.Most probably it was named in his name.

The Narayangarh Raja helped the Mughal prince Khurram (later Emperor Shah Jahan) when he revolted against his father.Shah Jahan Entitled him as 'Marh -e- Sultan'.

Major Chapman, who was entrusted with the task of repelling the Marathas from Midnapore, wrote a letter on 19th January, 1764 to Raja Parikshit Pal, ruler of Narayangarh of Midnapore, requesting him to supply the English army, encamping near Danton on the bank of Subarnarekha, with necessary provisions during the campaign.

See also
Narayangarh, Paschim Medinipur
Midnapore Raj
Narajole Raj

References

Bengali zamindars
Zamindari estates
Dynasties of India